Vito Eupollio Ragazzo (1927 – February 13, 2017) was an American gridiron football player, coach, and scout. He played college football at the College of William & Mary and professionally with the Hamilton Tiger-Cats of the Interprovincial Rugby Football Union, a forerunner of the Canadian Football League (CFL). Ragazzo served as the head football coach at the Virginia Military Institute (VMI) from 1966 to 1970 and at Shippensburg University of Pennsylvania from 1979 to 1985, compiling a career college football coaching record of 51–72–1.

Early life and playing career
Ragazzo was born in 1927, in Aflex, Kentucky. He attended Williamson High School in Williamson, West Virginia, where he played football as an end and was a teammate of Dick Hensley. He was inducted into the Williamson High School Athletic Hall of Fame as an Inaugural Class Member in 1998. Ragazzo played college football at the College of William & Mary. In his college career with the William & Mary Indians, he caught 15 touchdown passes, which stood as an National Collegiate Athletic Association (NCAA) record from 1949 until Howard Twilley of Tulsa broke it in 1965.

Head coaching record

College

See also
 List of NCAA major college football yearly receiving leaders

References

1927 births
2017 deaths
American football ends
American men's basketball players
American players of Canadian football
Canadian football defensive backs
East Carolina Pirates football coaches
Hamilton Tiger-Cats players
New England Patriots scouts
North Carolina Tar Heels football coaches
Shippensburg Red Raiders football coaches
VMI Keydets football coaches
Wake Forest Demon Deacons football coaches
William & Mary Tribe football players
William & Mary Tribe men's basketball players
High school football coaches in Virginia
People from Pike County, Kentucky
People from Williamson, West Virginia
Coaches of American football from West Virginia
Players of American football from West Virginia
American people of Italian descent